Blue John or Bluejohn may refer to:
Blue John, Kentucky, United States
Blue John (mineral), a form of fluorite mined in Derbyshire, England
Blue John Cavern, a cavern in Castleton, Derbyshire where fluorite is mined
Bluejohn Canyon, a canyon in Utah, United States, site of the Aron Ralston accident
Blue John (album), an album by organist John Patton
Lance-Constable Bluejohn, a character in the Discworld series, a member of Ankh-Morpork City Watch
 Blue John Gap, a fictional location in Arthur Conan Doyle's short story The Terror of Blue John Gap

See also
John Blue (disambiguation)